Terminal 5 is a New York City music venue in Hell's Kitchen, Manhattan, located at 610 West 56th Street west of Eleventh Avenue. It has a multi-level event site with five distinct room environments and a capacity of 3,000 people.

Alcoholic beverages are served during events along with light snacks. On most nights, a smoking section and bar are open on the roof deck. The venue is operated by The Bowery Presents.

The venue was formerly a nightclub called Club Exit (also known as Mirage and Carbon) until its closure by the Drug Enforcement Administration in 2003. Subsequently, Bowery Presents acquired and renovated the venue for live music shows.

References

External links

Music venues in Manhattan
Nightclubs in Manhattan
Drinking establishments in Manhattan
Hell's Kitchen, Manhattan